Nigel Knight (born 1956) is a British economist, author and political scientist. He has written books entitled Governing Britain since 1945 and Churchill: The Greatest Briton Unmasked.

Professional background
Knight is a Fellow and Director of Studies in Economics at Churchill College, University of Cambridge, and he lectures in the Faculty of Economics and Politics.

His book, Churchill: The Greatest Briton Unmasked, is a critical biography of British politician Winston Churchill. His book, Governing Britain since 1945 (2006), covers 60 years of British social policy.

Published works
 Knight, Nigel (2006). Governing Britain Since 1945, Politicos Publishing, 
 Knight, Nigel (2008). Churchill: The Greatest Briton Unmasked, David & Charles, 408 pages.

References

British political scientists
Fellows of Churchill College, Cambridge
Living people
1956 births
British non-fiction writers
British male writers
Male non-fiction writers